In control engineering, a discrete-event dynamic system (DEDS) is a discrete-state, event-driven system of which the state evolution depends entirely on the occurrence of asynchronous discrete events over time. Although similar to continuous-variable dynamic systems (CVDS), DEDS consists solely of discrete state spaces and event-driven state transition mechanisms.

Topics in DEDS include:

 Automata theory
 Supervisory control theory
 Petri net theory
 Discrete event system specification
 Boolean differential calculus
 Markov chain
 Queueing theory
 Discrete-event simulation
 Concurrent estimation

References
 
 
 

Control theory